The 2017–18 FIA Formula E Championship (known for commercial reasons as the 2017–18 ABB FIA Formula E Championship) was the fourth season of the Fédération Internationale de l'Automobile (FIA) Formula E motor racing. It featured the 2017–18 ABB FIA Formula E Championship, a motor racing championship for open-wheel electric racing cars, recognised by FIA, the sport's governing body, as the highest class of competition for electrically powered vehicles. Twenty drivers representing ten teams contested twelve ePrix, which started in Hong Kong on 2 December 2017 and ended on 15 July 2018 in New York City as they competed for the Drivers' and Teams' Championships.

2017–18 was the final season that the Spark-Renault SRT 01E chassis—which debuted in the 2014–15 Formula E season—was used in competition; as a brand new chassis package was introduced for the 2018–19 season.

Lucas di Grassi entered as the defending Drivers' Champion after securing his first title at the 2017 Montreal ePrix.  began the season as the defending Teams' Champion, having clinched its third consecutive accolade at the same event.

Frenchman Jean-Éric Vergne took victory in Drivers' Championship with 198 points, besting Lucas di Grassi and Sam Bird. Audi Sport Abt Schaeffler took victory in the Team's Championship, beating Techeetah by a narrow two point margin.

Teams and drivers
All teams used Spark chassis.

Team changes

Name changes 
The official entry list for the 2017–18 season contained a number of name changes for the teams. These were:
 Abt Schaeffler Audi Sport became Audi Sport Abt Schaeffler, reflecting increased involvement from Audi.
 Faraday Future Dragon Racing dropped the name Faraday Future from the official name to become Dragon Racing.
 NextEV NIO Formula E was shortened to become NIO Formula E.
 MS Amlin Andretti became MS&AD Andretti Formula E, pending future cooperation with BMW.

Driver changes

Joining Formula E
Former IndyCar and GP2 driver Luca Filippi joins Nio, replacing Nelson Piquet Jr. who moved to Jaguar.
 2008 A1 Grand Prix champion and 2016 World Endurance Champion Neel Jani joined the series with Dragon Racing replacing Loïc Duval.
2014 GP3 Series champion and 2017 12 Hours of Sebring winner Alex Lynn replaces José María López at DS Virgin Racing.
2011 Formula Nippon Champion and 2012 World Endurance Champion André Lotterer joins Techeetah replacing Stéphane Sarrazin.
 2010 Formula 3 Euro Series champion Edoardo Mortara will make his debut in Formula E with Venturi.
 DTM driver Tom Blomqvist was set to replace Robin Frijns at Andretti Autosport but his seat prior the first round was granted to FIA World Endurance Championship and Super Formula Championship driver Kamui Kobayashi.

Changing teams
2014–15 Formula E champion Nelson Piquet Jr. moves to Panasonic Jaguar Racing, replacing Adam Carroll.

Mid-season changes
After just one weekend in Hong Kong, Dragon Racing driver Neel Jani left the team in order to focus on his upcoming World Endurance Championship campaign. He was replaced by former DS Virgin Racing driver José María López.

For the first weekend in Hong Kong, Kamui Kobayashi was brought by MS&AD Andretti to satisfy sponsors. Tom Blomqvist however, took over that car after and raced it until the Paris round, where he left the team to focus on World Endurance Championship commitments with BMW, he was replaced by Stéphane Sarrazin.

Edoardo Mortara missed Berlin and the finale in New York due to DTM commitments with Mercedes. Mortara was replaced by Tom Dillmann on both occasions. 

Ma Qinghua subbed in for Luca Filippi at Nio Formula E Team for the Paris ePrix, to fulfill a contract obligation.

Rule changes
 The maximum power usage during the race was increased from 170 kW to 180 kW.
 A point for the fastest lap will be restricted to drivers finishing in the top 10, ending the incentive for drivers with damaged cars or placed outside points positions to switch cars to get fastest lap with no intent of finishing the race.

Calendar
In May 2017, a provisional calendar for the 2017–18 season was circulated. In September, the full calendar was announced. This calendar included new races in Santiago, São Paulo, Rome and Zürich, the latter of which will mark the first time since 1955 a motorsports circuit race will be held in Switzerland. The Buenos Aires round was discontinued, whilst the Monaco round will not be held due to the Historic Grand Prix of Monaco taking place in 2018. Later that year, on 30 November, it was announced that the São Paulo race would be postponed until 2019, with a race elsewhere to replace it in the schedule. It was later announced that Punta del Este in Uruguay, which had been on the schedule for seasons 1 and 2, would be returning in place of São Paulo.
On 18 December 2017, the Montreal ePrix was cancelled due to the Mayor of Montreal citing rising costs to the taxpayer. On 18 January 2018, it was announced the ePrix would not be replaced, thus decreasing the calendar to twelve rounds.

Results and standings

ePrix

Drivers' Championship standings
Points were awarded to the top ten classified finishers in every race, the pole position starter, and the driver who set the fastest lap, using the following structure:

† – Drivers did not finish the race, but were classified as they completed more than 90% of the race distance.

Teams' Championship standings

Footnotes

References

External links 

 

 
Formula E seasons
Formula E
Formula E
Formula E
Formula E